Jaime "Jim" Pebanco is a Filipino actor, known for Bulaklak ng Maynila (1999), Patikul (2011) and Hubog (2001). He was mostly seen in GMA Network and several shows in TV5 and ABS-CBN. He was also known in film such as for his role in Pacquiao: The Movie.

He portrayed different gay roles in film and television.

Career 
Pebanco started his career as a stage actor in 1981 when he first auditioned for the role of a chorus boy in Maynila, a musical staged at the Metropolitan Theater. He later played multiple roles in the Philam Life Theater musical  Ready Na 'Ko, Direk!.

In 1992, Pebanco underwent a theater workshop in the summer under a scholarship with the Bulwagang Gantimpala of the Cultural Center of the Philippines. He also took part in plays organized by the Philippine Educational Theater Association. His first non-musical straight play was Sipnget with Bella Flores.

For his role in the film Patikul as the character Haddic, an illiterate Tausug whose son joined the militant group Abu Sayaf, he was given the Best Supporting Actor Balanghai award at the 7th Cinemalaya Philippine Independent Film Festival’s Directors Showcase Category in 2017.

Filmography

Television

References 

Year of birth missing (living people)
Living people
Filipino male film actors
Filipino male stage actors
Filipino male television actors
ABS-CBN personalities
GMA Network personalities
TV5 (Philippine TV network) personalities